The list of shipwrecks in 1964 includes ships sunk, foundered, grounded, or otherwise lost during 1964.

January

3 January

10 January

12 January

13 January

16 January

18 January

20 January

25 January

26 January

February

2 February

3 February

8 February

10 February

11 February

17 February

18 February

21 February

23 February

March

1 March

6 March

11 March

14 March

15 March

16 March

18 March

23 March

25 March

27 March

28 March

April

2 April

4 April

6 April

8 April

10 April

13 April

14 April

May

1 May

2 May

4 May

10 May

23 May

27 May

28 May

June

1 June

3 June

12 June

13 June

21 June

29 June

July

3 July

8 July

10 July

12 July

16 July

17 July

21 July

23 July

24 July

Unknown date

August

1 August

2 August

4 August

6 August

8 August

10 August

11 August

25 August

September

1 September

5 September

6 September

7 September

11 September

13 September

14 September

17 September

18 September

20 September

25 September

29 September

30 September

Unknown date

October

7 October

9 October

12 October

14 October

15 October

18 October

22 October

25 October

26 October

27 October

28 October

29 October

November

1 November

11 November

15 November

17 November

19 November

20 November

23 November

24 November

26 November

29 November

December

1 December

2 December

3 December

7 December

12 December

13 December

14 December

17 December

22 December

23 December

24 December

27 December

28 December

Unknown date

Unknown date

References

See also 

1964
 
Ships